Kikuzato's brook snake (Opisthotropis kikuzatoi), also known commonly as Kikuzato's stream snake, is a species of snake in the family Colubridae.  The species is endemic to Ryukyu Islands (Japan).

Etymology
The specific name, kikuzatoi, is in honor of Kiyotasu Kikuzato, who collected the holotype.

Geographic range
O. kikuzatoi is found on Kumejima Island, one of the Okinawa Group islands of Japan.

Habitat
O. kikuzatoi is aquatic, inhabiting flowing streams in the northern and southern hilly regions of the island. Habitats between the two localities have been completely converted to agricultural land.

Threats
This species, O. kikuzatoi, is listed as Critically Endangered by the IUCN under criterion B1ab(iii,v)+2ab(iii,v), due to threats from capturing as bycatch, water pollution, and predation from introduced species, primarily Lithobates catesbeianus,  the American bullfrog. The American bullfrog was introduced was introduced to Kumeijima Island in 1953, and predation may provide great pressure on the population after many decades of population decline. Inbreeding within the small (and isolated) populations is becoming a significant threat also. Specimens have been observed with minor abnormalities (asymmetrical scales on the head) not recorded in the past.

Diet
O. kikuzatoi feeds on earthworms, freshwater shrimp, freshwater fishes, tadpoles, and frogs.

Reproduction
Kikuzato's brook snake is oviparous.

References

Further reading
Okada Y, Takara T (1958). "A New Species of Liopeltis (Ophidia, Colubridae) from the Ryukyu Islands". Bull. Biogeograph. Soc. Japan 20 (3): 1–3. (Liopeltis kikuzatoi, new species).
Ota H (2004). "Field observations on a highly endangered snake, Opisthotropis kikuzatoi (Squamata: Colubridae), endemic to Kumejima Island, Japan". Current Herpetology 23 (2): 73–80.

External links

Opisthotropis
Snakes of Asia
Endemic reptiles of Japan
Endemic fauna of the Ryukyu Islands
Critically endangered fauna of Asia
Reptiles described in 1958
Taxonomy articles created by Polbot